UHF II is an album by the rock band UHF, released in 1994. consisting of singer-songwriters Bill Henderson of Chilliwack fame, Shari Ulrich, and Roy Forbes.

Tracks
 "Lifting My Heart" (3:57)
 "Watching the River Run" (3:41)
 "Wild One" (3:27)
 "Don’t You Cry" (4:19)
 "There Must Be Some Way" (4:31)
 "Changed Forever" (3:21)
 "Boiling River" (4:10)
 "Stand" (3:26)
 "I’m On the Edge" (3:40)
 "Time Will Take Its Toll" (4:23)
 "Goodbye" (3:42)
 "Call Up an Old Friend" (4:06)

Members
Bill Henderson – guitar, accordion, vocals
Shari Ulrich – piano, violin, mandolin, rhythm guitar, vocals
Roy Forbes – guitar, mandolin, vocals

1994 albums
UHF (Canadian band) albums